14 Steps to a Better You is the second studio album by Australian indie pop band Lime Cordiale, released on 10 July 2020 through Chugg Music Entertainment.

At the 2020 J Awards in November 2020, the album won Australian Album of the Year.

At the 2020 ARIA Music Awards, the album received six nominations, including for Album of the Year, and for Breakthrough Artist – Release, which it won.

At the AIR Awards of 2021, the album was nominated for Best Independent Rock Album or EP.

The album was re-released on 13 November 2020, with six new tracks.

Background
Band member Oliver Leimbach told Stack Magazine: "One of the major messages of this album [is] sort of not to take yourself too seriously. Do the things you love to do, but also, don't leave this world without making a good, positive effect. It's like this contradictory message… [which] I think fits well with a song like 'No Plans' that sounds so silly. But the song is talking to someone that's money-driven, and power-driven, and thinking about themselves. The silliness is a bit cheeky, and taking the piss out of that character."

Critical reception

Sose Fuamoli from Triple J called the album "a defining musical statement" Fuamoli said "It's Lime Cordiale, summarised in 14 tracks. It incorporates the spirit of fun that's driven [their] work to date, but sees them develop their songwriting in depth and nuance. Oli and Louis have always been self-aware when it comes to their lyricism - but here they've taken it up an extra notch."

Ali Shutler from NME said "14 Steps to a Better You never lets go of the beating heart that's made relatable stars of Lime Cordiale."

Track listing

Personnel
Adapted from the album's liner notes.

Musicians
Lime Cordiale
 Oliver Leimbach – vocals, guitar, bass, saxophone, trumpet, flute, clarinet, kazoo 
 Louis Leimbach – vocals, guitar, bass, saxophone, trumpet, flute, clarinet, kazoo 

Other musicians
 S. Abrahams – writing 
 J. Parkfar – writing 
 B. Choder – writing 
 D. Haddad – writing 
 M. Wofford – writing 
 A. Dawson – writing 
 James Jennings – drums 
 Felix Bornholdt – keyboards , writing 
 Nicholas Polovineo – trombone, trumpet, flugelhorn 
 Chris O'Dea – baritone saxophone 
 Lachlan Hamilton – saxophone 
 Karen Leimbach – cello 
 Lisa Buchanan – violin

Technical
 Dave Hammer – production, mixing 
 Brian Lucey at Magic Gardens Mastering – mastering 
 Simon Berckelman – production

Artwork
 Louis Leimbach – artwork creation

Charts

Weekly charts

Year-end charts

Certifications

Release history

See also
 List of number-one albums of 2020 (Australia)

References

Notes

External links
 

2020 albums
Lime Cordiale albums
Albums produced by Dave Hammer
ARIA Award-winning albums